Richard Jones (1603 – 1655 or 1656) was a Welsh Anglican priest and writer.

Jones, from north Wales, was educated at Jesus College, Oxford, where he obtained a BA degree in 1626 and his MA in 1628. He was ordained as an Anglican priest and became vicar of Llanfair Caereinion, Montgomeryshire, Wales in 1636. In 1650, during the English Commonwealth, he was deprived of this position by the Council for the Propagation of the Gospel in Wales, although he continued to work in the parish. He died in late 1655 or early 1656.

References

1603 births
1650s deaths
Year of death uncertain
17th-century Welsh Anglican priests
Alumni of Jesus College, Oxford
Welsh-language writers